The Puyuma, also known as the Pinuyumayan, Peinan or Beinan, are one of the indigenous groups of the Taiwanese aborigines. The people are generally divided into the Chihpen and Nanwang groups, both resident in Taitung County on the east coast of Taiwan.

In the year 2000, the Puyuma numbered 9,606. This was approximately 2.4% of Taiwan's total indigenous population, making them the sixth-largest indigenous group. The Puyuma speak the Puyuma language, as well as Mandarin and Taiwanese Hokkien.

The name "Puyuma" means "unity" or "concord" and was originally the autonym of the speakers of the Nanwang dialect. Zeitoun and Cauquelin (2006) also note that the word Puyuma can be analyzed as pu'-uma, which means "to send to the field".

Villages
Puyuma villages include (located in Beinan Township and Taitung City):
Ulibulibuk 
Bankio 
Alipai 
Pinaski
Tamalakaw
Rikabung
Puyuma (Nanwang)
Peinan
Balangaw
Apapalo
Kasabakan
Katipul
Nirbuaqan

Notable Puyuma people

 A-mei, pop singer
 Paelabang Danapan, Vice President of Control Yuan
 Saya Chang, singer (and A-mei's younger sister)
 Erica Chiang, singer
 Jane Huang, singer of Taiwanese rock duo Y2J
 Samingad, singer
 Jia Jia, singer
 Purdur, singer
 Panai, singer
 Tank, singer
 Sangpuy Katatepan Mavaliyw, Puyuma language singer
 Baday, author
 Kuciling Katatepan, traditional carver
 Iming, sculptor

See also

 Demographics of Taiwan
 Palakuan
 Puyuma Pulingaw
 Taiwanese indigenous peoples

References

External links

 Taiwan Culture Portal: Making a man out of a boy: the Puyumas’ rite of passage in the House of Men (in English)
A Puyuma singer's story Singer works to insert indigenous songs into mainstream